Sir Harold Parker, KCB, KBE, MC (1895 – 5 February 1980) was an English civil servant. He entered the civil service in 1914 but his career was interrupted by service in the First World War; he joined HM Treasury after demobilisation in 1919. He was deputy secretary at the Ministry of Pensions from 1941 to 1946 and the Secretary of the Ministry from 1946 to 1948. Between 1947 and 1956, he was the Permanent Secretary of the Ministry of Defence. After leaving the service, he was chairman of the Corporation of Insurance Brokers Society of Pension Consultants until 1970, and a president of the Amateur Swimming Association in 1958.

References 

1895 births
1980 deaths
English civil servants
Knights Companion of the Order of the Bath
Knights Commander of the Order of the British Empire